Xusom or XUSOM may represent the Xavier University School of Medicine:

Xavier University School of Medicine, Aruba, Aruba
Xavier University School of Medicine, Bonaire